The Northrop-Hendy T37 Turbodyne (company designation N-10) was an American turboprop engine developed by the Turbodyne Division of Northrop in the late 1940s.

Design and development

Turbodyne I
Northrop undertook a private venture to develop a turboprop engine from 1939 and was awarded a joint US Army/US Navy contract in 1941 for design, analysis and fabrication of a research compressor for the proposed engine. The contract was amended later to call for construction of two complete engine prototypes.

Northrop had neither the space or expertise to fabricate the engines in a reasonable time-scale so they joined forces with the Joshua Hendy Iron Works in 1944 to form the Northrop-Hendy company. the two prototype engines were completed and test run in late 1944, but the first engine compressor failed, destroying the engine. Meanwhile the USN cancelled their interest in the engine in 1945, leaving the US Army to carry on. Testing continued with the second engine until that too failed, terminating the programme.

Throughout testing the prototype engines failed to meet performance estimates due to poor compressor and turbine efficiencies.

XT37
Northrop-Hendy continued their partnership to develop the XT37, a large turboprop, expected to deliver ca , but this too failed to deliver on the promised performance.

N-10 designation confusion 
Officially, the company designation N-10 was assigned to the T37 Turbodyne.  However, drawings exists of a flying wing cargo aircraft designated N-10.  The reason that both the Turbodyne and this flying wing design were assigned the designation is unknown.

Specifications (Northrop-Hendy Turbodyne I)

See also

References

1940s turboprop engines